Miguel Peña (1781, Valencia, Carabobo - 1833) was a Venezuelan politician. He was active in the Venezuelan War of Independence and was a signatory to Venezuela's first constitution. He is buried in the National Pantheon of Venezuela.

Miguel Peña Parish in Valencia, Carabobo is named for him.

1781 births
1833 deaths
People from Valencia, Venezuela
Venezuelan politicians